31 Boötis is a single star in the northern constellation of Boötes, located 470 light years from the Sun. It is visible to the naked eye as a faint, yellow-hued star with an apparent visual magnitude of 4.86. The object is moving closer to the Earth with a heliocentric radial velocity of −16.5 km/s. It was known to be part of a constellation between Virgo and Boötes named Mons Maenalus, it was also the brightest star in the constellation.

This is an evolved giant star with a stellar classification of G7 IIIa. It is a suspected variable star of unknown type, and is an X-ray source. The star is 370 million years old with 3.27 times the mass of the Sun. Having exhausted the hydrogen at its core, the star has expanded to 23 times the Sun's radius. It is radiating 275 times the luminosity of the Sun from its swollen photosphere at an effective temperature of 4,874 K.

References

External links
 HR 5480
 Image 31 Boötis

G-type giants
Suspected variables
Boötes
Durchmusterung objects
Bootis, 31
129312
071832
5480